Finglas is a civil parish mainly situated in the barony of Castleknock in the traditional county of Dublin, Ireland. It contains 34 townlands. Today, the parish is split between two local government areas: the modern county of Fingal (to the west) and Dublin City Council (to the east).

Location
Like all civil parishes in Ireland, this civil parish is derived from, and co-extensive with, a pre-existing parish of the Church of Ireland. The Archdiocese of Dublin held a number of manors as cross lands. The manor of Finglas contained most of the area of the parish in four distinct parcels of 4,487 acres in total. The core of the parish is centered on the village of Finglas, which lies within the barony of Castleknock. However, a substantial exclave of the parish is situated within the neighbouring barony of Nethercross. Since Kilreesk has a cell toponym, this suggests that the church was a pre-Invasion chapel of ease. This parcel of land contains six townlands. Additionally, within the barony of Castleknock itself, two further parcels of land, that are distinct from the core around the village, are situated to the north of the barony. The larger parcel contains six townlands around the Kilshane chapel of ease. The smaller parcel consists of a single townland and is surrounded by the civil parishes of Mulhuddart and Cloghran.

Townlands

References

Sources

Citations

External links

 Finglas parish delineated on OpenStreetMap

Finglas
Civil parishes of the barony of Castleknock
Civil parishes of the barony of Nethercross